The Russia men's national softball team is the men's national softball team of Russia.  The team competed at the 1996 ISF Men's World Championship in Midland, Michigan where they finished with 1 win and 9 losses.

Due to the 2022 Russian invasion of Ukraine, the World Baseball Softball Confederation banned Russian athletes and officials.

References

Softball
Men's national softball teams
Men's sport in Russia
Softball in Russia